Chamaz Koti (also Romanized as Chemāz Ketī and Chamāz Katī; is a village in Nowkand Kola Rural District, in the Central District of Qaem Shahr County, Mazandaran Province, Iran. At the 2006 census, its population was 5,552, in 1,423 families.

Tourist attractions of Chamazketi village

   1- The fact that this village is known as the village of kebabs

   The people of Chamazaketi village are famous for several things, the most important of which is that they have an excessive interest in barbecuing and are eating barbeque for any reason. In this village, there are a large number of kebab shops that are actively serving the people and make a living in this way. The people, especially the youth of this village, have been inviting each other to eat kebabs on various occasions for years. It has become almost a daily routine. Along with the freshness of mutton, skillful cooking of kebab, which has become professional over the years, is also one of the things that has brought people from other villages to this place.

   2- Zarin Nava tomb palace

   According to the pilgrimage record inside the mausoleum, the name of the deceased is Agha Seyyed Mohammad, the son of Seyyed Ali Zarin Navaei, and this work was registered as one of Iran's national works on March 25, 1379 with the number 3327.  Zarin Nava tomb tower (sayze nava in local dialect) is located in Chamazketi village between the old and current cemetery of the place and among the old trees, and agricultural lands surround this complex. It is the 9th century AH.

References 

Populated places in Qaem Shahr County